The 25th National Geographic Bee was held in Washington, D.C. on May 22, 2013, sponsored by the National Geographic Society.  This was the final National Geographic Bee that Alex Trebek hosted--at the end of the event, Alex announced that Soledad O'Brien would be next year's moderator.      

Twelve-year-old Sathwik Karnik, from Plainville, Massachusetts won the competition, beating out 52 other competitors representing the 50 U.S. states, Pacific territories, and Department of Defense dependent schools.

2013 state representatives

References

2013 in Washington, D.C.
2013 in education
National Geographic Bee